Bent Peder Benjamin Rasch (31 May 1934 - 26 November 1988) was a Danish sprint canoeist who competed in the early 1950s. At the 1952 Summer Olympics in Helsinki, he won a gold in the C-2 1000 m event.

A native of Copenhagen, Rasch emigrated to Canada where he died in Vancouver in 1988.

References

1934 births
1988 deaths
Canoeists at the 1952 Summer Olympics
Danish male canoeists
Olympic canoeists of Denmark
Olympic gold medalists for Denmark
Sportspeople from Copenhagen
Sportspeople from Vancouver
Danish emigrants to Canada
Canadian people of Danish descent
Olympic medalists in canoeing

Medalists at the 1952 Summer Olympics